Myelois pollinella is a species of snout moth in the genus Myelois. It was described by Hugo Theodor Christoph in 1877 and is known from Turkmenistan (including Krasnowodsk, the type location).

References

Moths described in 1877
Phycitini